Ruspolia baileyi is a species of bush cricket found in Guinea.

References

baileyi
Insects described in 1997